The 1995–96 NBA season was the eighth season for the Miami Heat in the National Basketball Association. The Heat had the tenth pick in the 1995 NBA draft, and selected Kurt Thomas out of Texas Christian University. Under new head coach Pat Riley, the Heat would be restructured. On the first day of the regular season, which began on November 3, they acquired All-Star center Alonzo Mourning from the Charlotte Hornets. With the addition of Mourning, along with the off-season acquisition of Rex Chapman from the Washington Bullets, the Heat won 11 of their first 14 games, but then lost 23 of their next 34 games, holding a 22–26 at the All-Star break.

Riley continued to make changes as he would make three more deals at the trading deadline. The club traded Kevin Willis and Bimbo Coles to the Golden State Warriors in exchange for All-Star guard Tim Hardaway and Chris Gatling, while trading Billy Owens and Kevin Gamble to the Sacramento Kings in exchange for Walt Williams and Tyrone Corbin, and then trading rookie guard Terrence Rencher to the Phoenix Suns in exchange for Tony Smith. The flurry of deadline deals led to one of the most remarkable wins of the season, as the Heat only had eight players available to face the Chicago Bulls at the Miami Arena on February 23, 1996, but won 113–104, thanks mainly to a 39-point game by Chapman (this was one of only 10 losses the Bulls suffered on their way to a then-record 72-win season). The team also signed free agents Jeff Malone, who was previously released by the Philadelphia 76ers, and rookie guard Voshon Lenard, who previously played in the Continental Basketball Association.

The Heat played above. 500 for the remainder of the season, and finished third in the Atlantic Division with a 42–40 record, which was good enough for the #8 seed in the Eastern Conference. Mourning averaged 23.2 points, 10.4 rebounds and 2.7 blocks per game, while Chapman provided the team with 14.0 points per game, but only played 56 games due to a Achilles tendon injury, rookie guard Sasha Danilovic contributed 13.4 points per game, but only played just 19 games due to a wrist injury, and Thomas provided with 9.0 points and 5.9 rebounds per game. Mourning also became the first Heat player to appear in an All-Star Game, as he was selected for the 1996 NBA All-Star Game in San Antonio.

In the Eastern Conference First Round of the playoffs, the Heat lost in three straight games to the Bulls, who were led by Michael Jordan, Scottie Pippen and Dennis Rodman. The Bulls would defeat the Seattle SuperSonics in six games in the NBA Finals, winning their fourth championship in six years. Following the season, Chapman signed as a free agent with the Phoenix Suns, while Williams signed with the Toronto Raptors, Gatling signed with the Dallas Mavericks, Corbin signed with the Atlanta Hawks, Smith signed with the Charlotte Hornets, and Malone retired.

For the season, the Heat added new red alternate road uniforms, which remained in use until 1999.

Offseason

NBA Draft

Roster

Regular season

Season standings

Record vs. opponents

Schedule

Playoffs

|- align="center" bgcolor="#ffcccc"
| 1
| April 26
| @ Chicago
| L 85–102
| Tim Hardaway (30)
| Chris Gatling (9)
| Tim Hardaway (7)
| United Center24,104
| 0–1
|- align="center" bgcolor="#ffcccc"
| 2
| April 28
| @ Chicago
| L 75–106
| Sasha Danilovic (15)
| Chris Gatling (11)
| Tim Hardaway (4)
| United Center24,202
| 0–2
|- align="center" bgcolor="#ffcccc"
| 3
| May 1
| Chicago
| L 91–112
| Alonzo Mourning (30)
| Mourning, Thomas (8)
| Tim Hardaway (6)
| Miami Arena15,200
| 0–3
|-

Player statistics

NOTE: Please write the players statistics in alphabetical order by last name.

Season

Playoffs

Transactions
July 1, 1995
 Released Brad Lohaus.
 Released Ledell Eackles.

September 1, 1995
 Traded a 1996 1st round draft pick (Walter McCarty) to the New York Knicks for Pat Riley (coach).

September 29, 1995
 Brad Lohaus signed as an unrestricted free agent with the San Antonio Spurs.

October 5, 1995
 Signed Ron Grandison as a free agent.
 Signed Stacey King as a free agent.
 Signed Bruce Bowen as a free agent.

October 13, 1995
 Waived Bruce Bowen.

November 3, 1995
 Traded Matt Geiger, Khalid Reeves, Glen Rice, and a 1996 1st round draft pick (Tony Delk) to the Charlotte Hornets for LeRon Ellis, Alonzo Mourning, and Pete Myers.

December 12, 1995
 Signed Danny Schayes to a contract for remainder of season.

December 27, 1995
 Waived LeRon Ellis.

December 29, 1995
 Signed Voshon Lenard as a free agent.

January 5, 1996
 Waived Ron Grandison.

February 12, 1996
 Signed Jeff Malone to a 10-day contract.
 Waived Pete Myers.

February 22, 1996
 Traded Bimbo Coles and Kevin Willis to the Golden State Warriors for Chris Gatling and Tim Hardaway.
 Traded Kevin Gamble and Billy Owens to the Sacramento Kings for Tyrone Corbin and Walt Williams.
 Traded Terrence Rencher to the Phoenix Suns for Tony Smith.

March 3, 1996
 Signed Jeff Malone to a contract for remainder of season.

June 26, 1996
 Traded a 2000 1st round draft pick (DeShawn Stevenson) to the Utah Jazz for Martin Müürsepp.

Player Transactions Citation:

Postseason
The Heat would qualify for the playoffs by beating out the Charlotte Hornets by 1 game for the final playoff spot in the Eastern Conference with a record of 42 wins and 40 losses. In the playoffs, the Heat were swept in 3 straight games. The Heat would lose by double digits in each game to the eventual World Champion Chicago Bulls.

Awards, records, and honors
Pat Riley led the Heat to a 42-40 record which tying the franchise record for best record.
Alonzo Mourning was voted by fans to be in the All-Star Game.

References
Notes

Sources
 Heat on Database Basketball
 Heat on Basketball Reference

Miami Heat seasons
Miami
Miami Heat
Miami Heat